The Bayer designation b Cygni is shared by three stars in the constellation Cygnus:
b1 Cygni (V2008 Cygni), an RS CVn variable
b2 Cygni (V1624 Cygni), a Be star
b3 Cygni (V1644 Cygni), a δ Scuti variable

See also
Albireo (β Cygni)

Cygni, b
Cygnus (constellation)